Frank Ostholt (born 23 September 1975 in Warendorf, West Germany) is a German eventing rider. With his horse Mr. Medicott, he won a gold medal in team eventing at the 2008 Summer Olympics. He is married to Swedish equestrian Sara Algotsson Ostholt.

Notable Horses 

 Air Jordan 2 - 1995 Chestnut Hanoverian Gelding (Amerigo Vespucci XX x Wittensee)
 2004 Athens Olympics - Team Fourth Place, Individual 24th Place
 2005 European Championships - Team Bronze Medal, Individual Fifth Place
 2006 World Equestrian Games - Team Gold Medal, Individual Fourth Place
 2008 FEI World Cup Final - Bronze Medal
 2009 FEI World Cup Final - Silver Medal
 Quite Easy 6 - 2001 Chestnut Westfalen Mare (Quattro B x Akittos XX)
 2007 FEI Eventing Young Horse World Championships - Gold Medal
 2008 FEI Eventing Young Horse World Championships - Fifteenth Place
 Mr. Medicott - 1999 Chestnut Irish Sport Horse Gelding (Cruising x Edmund Burke)
 2008 Beijing Olympics - Team Gold Medal, Individual 25th Place
 2010 World Equestrian Games - Individual 21st Place
 Sir Medicott - 2003 Bay German Warmblood Gelding (Campbell 5 x Baylis XX)
 2009 FEI Eventing Young Horse World Championships - Bronze Medal
 Little Paint - 1998 Bay German Warmblood Gelding (Nitron x I'm a Star XX)
 2011 European Championships - Individual Bronze Medal
 Jum Jum - 2010 Bay Westfalen Gelding (Jaguar Mail x Papoi's Boy XX)
 2017 FEI Eventing Young Horse World Championships - Ninth Place

References

1975 births
Living people
People from Warendorf
Sportspeople from Münster (region)
German event riders
German male equestrians
Olympic equestrians of Germany
Equestrians at the 2004 Summer Olympics
Equestrians at the 2008 Summer Olympics
Olympic gold medalists for Germany
Olympic medalists in equestrian
Medalists at the 2008 Summer Olympics
Recipients of the Silver Laurel Leaf